A briolette is a style of gemstone cut - an elongated, faceted pear shape. It is often drilled to hang as a bead. The style was popular during the Victorian era.

The Smithsonian Institution has a  diamond briolette necklace presented by Napoleon Bonaparte in 1811 to his Empress consort Marie Louise.

See also
 Pendeloque

References

Gemstone cutting